The Metropolitan Commission of Sewers was one of London's first steps towards bringing its sewer and drainage infrastructure under the control of a single public body. It was absorbed by the Metropolitan Board of Works on 1 January 1856.

Formation
The commission was formed by the Metropolitan Commission of Sewers Act 1848 (11 & 12 Vict., c. 112), partly in response to public health concerns following serious outbreaks of cholera. The commission's mandate was renewed and amended with supplementary Acts in 1851, 1852, 1853, 1854 and 1855. Commissioners included Sir Edwin Chadwick, Robert Stephenson and Thomas Field Gibson.

The new body combined eight local boards of commissioners that had been established by earlier acts of parliament:
 Tower Hamlets Commission of Sewers
 St Katharine's Commission of Sewers
 Poplar and Blackwall Commission of Sewers
 Holborn and Finsbury Commission of Sewers
 Westminster and Middlesex Commission of Sewers 
 Surrey and Kent Commission of Sewers
 Greenwich Commission of Sewers
 Commissioners of the Regent's Park Sewers

The area covered by the Metropolitan Commission was defined as the City and Liberties of Westminster, the borough of Southwark, the areas of the previous commissioners and "any such other place in the Counties of Middlesex, Surrey, Essex and Kent or any of them, being not more than twelve miles distant in a straight line from St. Paul's Cathedral, but not being in the City of London or the liberties thereof". No area was to be exempt from the commission's jurisdiction by virtue of being extra-parochial or beyond the ebb or flow of the tide. The headquarters of the commission were at 1, Greek Street, Soho.

The City of London was excluded as it had its own Commission of Sewers dating back to 1669.

Activities
The commission surveyed London's antiquated sewerage system and set about ridding the capital of an estimated 200,000 cesspits, insisting that all cesspits should be closed and that house drains should connect to sewers and empty into the Thames (ultimately, a major contributing factor to "The Great Stink" of 1858).

The commission was notable in that it employed Joseph Bazalgette, first as assistant surveyor (from 1849), taking over as engineer in 1852 after his predecessor died of "harassing fatigues and anxieties". Bazalgette was then appointed chief engineer of the commission's successor, the Metropolitan Board of Works in 1856, and by the end of the decade after "The Great Stink" – his proposals to modernise the London sewerage system were being implemented.

Chairmen
 Viscount Ebrington (1 January 1849 – 6 October 1851)
 Edward Lawes (6 October 1851 – 24 July 1852)
 Richard Jebb (24 July 1852 – 1 January 1856)

See also
 Public Health Act 1848
 Medical Officer for Health
 Commissions of sewers

References

History of local government in London (pre-1855)
Water supply and sanitation in London
Former water company predecessors of Thames Water
1848 in London